Akram Dashti is a Pakistani politician who has been a Member of the Senate of Pakistan, since March 2018.

Political career
Dashti was elected to the Senate of Pakistan as a candidate of National Party on general seat from Balochistan in 2018 Pakistani Senate election. He took oath as Senator on 12 March 2018.

References

Living people
Year of birth missing (living people)
Place of birth missing (living people)
Members of the Senate of Pakistan